Wimpstone may refer to:

 Wimpstone, Warwickshire, a hamlet in England
 Wimpstone, Devon, an ancient name of the manor Whympston in England